Ken Woodruff is an American television writer and producer. He has written and produced for CBS's The Mentalist for six seasons, and was a producer and writer for Fox's Gotham, also created by Mentalist creator Bruno Heller. Woodruff has also penned two episodes of CBS' Shark.

Woodruff also has experience being a producer's assistant on Fox's The O.C. from the year 2003.

References

American television producers
American television writers
American male television writers
Living people
Year of birth missing (living people)